Miffo is a 2003 Swedish film directed by Daniel Lind Lagerlöf.

Cast
 Jonas Karlsson as Tobias Carling
 Livia Millhagen as Carola Christiansson
 Ingvar Hirdwall as Karl Henrik
 Liv Mjönes as Jenny Brunander
 Kajsa Ernst as Sonja
 Isa Aouifia as Leo
 Fyr Thorwald as Håkan "Håkke" Bodin
 Carina Boberg as Karin
 Gustav Levin as Erik
 Malin Crépin as Anna
 Robin Keller as Jonny
 Jan-Erik Emretsson as Gunnar
 Joel Östlund as Ruben
 Stig Asp as Leif

External links
 
 

2003 films
Swedish romantic comedy-drama films
2000s Swedish-language films
Films directed by Daniel Lind Lagerlöf
2000s Swedish films